Jacaranda brasiliana is a species of flowering plant in the family Bignoniaceae. It is native to Brazil, including in the Cerrado region.

brasiliana
Flora of Brazil
Flora of the Cerrado